ORF6 is a gene that encodes a viral accessory protein in coronaviruses of the subgenus Sarbecovirus, including SARS-CoV and SARS-CoV-2. It is not present in MERS-CoV. It is thought to reduce the immune system response to viral infection through interferon antagonism.

Structure
The ORF6 protein is fairly small at 63 amino acid residues long in SARS-CoV and 61 in SARS-CoV-2. The ORF6 sequence is not well conserved and it has a relatively low sequence identity between the two viruses at about 66%. It has an amphipathic N-terminal alpha helix that associates with the membrane, but is not a transmembrane protein. Its approximately 20-residue C-terminal tail is polar and extends into the cytosol, and contains signal sequences for protein trafficking.

Expression and localization
Like the genes for other accessory proteins, the ORF6 gene is located near those encoding the structural proteins, at the 5' end of the coronavirus RNA genome. Along with ORF7a, ORF7b, and ORF8, ORF6 is located between the membrane (M) and nucleocapsid (N) genes. It is localized to the endoplasmic reticulum and Golgi apparatus, with studies in SARS-CoV-2 also indicating association with vesicles such as autophagosomes and lysosomes.

Function
The primary function of the ORF6 protein is thought to be immunomodulation and interferon antagonism. It is not essential for viral replication, though its absence appears to reduce replication efficiency.

Viral protein interactions
Studies in SARS-CoV suggest that the ORF6 protein exhibits protein-protein interactions with another viral accessory protein, ORF9b protein. In SARS-CoV, but not in recombinant murine hepatitis virus, ORF6 protein has been detected in virus-like particles and mature virions, suggesting it can be a minor viral structural protein.

Immune effects
The ORF6 protein from both SARS-CoV and SARS-CoV-2 is an interferon antagonist and thought to be involved in immune evasion. Several protein-protein interactions with host cell proteins have been described to mediate this effect. It has been reported to inhibit nuclear import of the STAT transcription factor, inhibiting interferon activation. Studies of SARS-CoV report this may be mediated by binding of ORF6 protein to karyopherins. In SARS-CoV-2, the ORF6 protein reportedly interacts with RAE1 and NUP98, blocking karyopherin interactions.

References

Coronavirus proteins